The 2014–15 season will be Nyíregyháza Spartacus's 1st consecutive season in the Nemzeti Bajnokság II and 86th year in existence as a football club.

First team squad

Transfers

Summer

In:

Out:

List of Hungarian football transfers summer 2014

Statistics

Appearances and goals
Last updated on 9 December 2014.

|-
|colspan="14"|Youth players:

|-
|colspan="14"|Players no longer at the club:
|}

Top scorers
Includes all competitive matches. The list is sorted by shirt number when total goals are equal.

Last updated on 9 December 2014

Disciplinary record
Includes all competitive matches. Players with 1 card or more included only.

Last updated on 9 December 2014

Overall
{|class="wikitable"
|-
|Games played || 27 (16 OTP Bank Liga, 3 Hungarian Cup and 8 Hungarian League Cup)
|-
|Games won || 11 (4 OTP Bank Liga, 2 Hungarian Cup and 5 Hungarian League Cup)
|-
|Games drawn || 4 (2 OTP Bank Liga, 0 Hungarian Cup and 2 Hungarian League Cup)
|-
|Games lost || 12 (10 OTP Bank Liga, 1 Hungarian Cup and 1 Hungarian League Cup)
|-
|Goals scored || 46
|-
|Goals conceded || 35
|-
|Goal difference || +11
|-
|Yellow cards || 54
|-
|Red cards || 4
|-
|rowspan="1"|Worst discipline ||  Ferenc Fodor (5 , 1 )
|-
|rowspan="2"|Best result || 8–0 (A) v Kalocsa - OTP Bank Liga - 13-08-2014
|-
| 8–0 (A) v Győrsövényház - OTP Bank Liga - 10-09-2014
|-
|rowspan="1"|Worst result || 0–5 (A) v Debrecen - OTP Bank Liga - 30-11-2014
|-
|rowspan="1"|Most appearances ||  László Pekár (24 appearances)
|-
|rowspan="1"|Top scorer ||  László Pekár (13 goals)
|-
|Points || 37/81 (45.68%)
|-

Nemzeti Bajnokság I

Matches

Classification

Results summary

Results by round

Hungarian Cup

League Cup

Knockout phase

References

External links
 Official Website
 Magyarfutball
 UEFA
 fixtures and results

Nyíregyháza Spartacus FC seasons
Nyiregyhaza Spartacus